The Faihriem, or Saihriem, are one of the clans of Hmar tribe located in the Indian states of Assam , Manipur and Mizoram who speak the Saihriem dialect. 

The clan is recognised by the Constitution of India as Saihriem under Any Kuki tribes in Assam [In accordance with The Scheduled Castes and Scheduled Tribes Orders (Amendment) Act, 1976.], Meghalaya [In accordance with The Scheduled Castes and Scheduled Tribes Orders (Amendment) Act, 1976 and The Constitution (Scheduled Tribes) Order (Amendment Act, 1987] and Mizoram [In accordance with The Scheduled Castes and Scheduled Tribes Lists (Modification) Order, 1956 and as inserted by Act 81 of 1971]

However, the name of the tribe as well as the language was wrongly written as Sairang in the Census of India, 1901. Volume IV. Assam. Part I. Report by B.C. Allen, B.A., I.C.S. Print 1902. Chapter VIII, page 90.

References 

B.C.Allen, B.A., ICS, Superintendent of Census Operations in Assam. Census of India, 1901. Volume IV. Assam. Part I. Report. Printed at the Assam Secretariat Printing Office, 1902.

1999, Robin D. Tribhuwan, Preeti R. Tribhuwan. Tribal Dances of India (Encyclopaedic profile of Indian tribes, volume 1). Page 117.

Gazette of India Extraordinary No.40, New Delhi. Wednesday, 6 September 1950. S.R.O. 510.

Hmar
Ethnic groups in Northeast India
Mizo clans
Kuki tribes
Ethnic groups in South Asia